Eszter Perenyi (born December 15, 1943) is a Budapest-born Hungarian violinist and Meritorious Artist of Hungary. She have graduated from the Franz Liszt Academy of Music and then played Erich Leinsdorf and István Kertész at the London Symphony Orchestra. She also performed abroad in such countries as Germany, Italy and Sweden and since 1975 became a teacher at Liszt Academy. In 2002 she became a recipient of the Bartók-Pásztory Prize and five years later was named a Merited Artist of the Republic of Hungary.

Discography 
Violin Sonatas.  Handel, Tartini, Veracini

References

1943 births
Living people
Hungarian classical violinists
Musicians from Budapest
Franz Liszt Academy of Music alumni
London Symphony Orchestra players
Merited artists of the Republic of Hungary
21st-century classical violinists
Women classical violinists